Kikumoto (written: 菊本) is a Japanese surname. Notable people with the surname include:

Tadao Kikumoto, Japanese engineer
, Japanese footballer

Japanese-language surnames